is a Japanese surname meaning "tall tree". Notable people with the surname include:

Akimitsu Takagi (1920–1995), Japanese crime fiction writer
Jon Mamoru Takagi (1942–1984), American martial arts instructor
, Japanese footballer
Hinako Takagi (born 1989), Japanese composer and pianist
Hitoshi Takagi (1925–2004), Japanese voice actor
, Japanese professional wrestler
Kaietsu Takagi (1883–1957), Japanese photographer
Kazumichi Takagi (born 1980), Japanese football player
Keizō Takagi (born 1941), Japanese writer, journalist and educator
, Japanese ice hockey player
Maria Takagi (born 1978), Japanese former AV star and TV actress
Takagi Masao (高木正雄), the Japanese name of South Korean president Park Chung-hee (1917–1979)
Miho Takagi (born 1994), Japanese speed skater
Mototeru Takagi (1941–2002), Japanese free jazz musician
Nana Takagi (born 1992), Japanese speed skater
Paul Takagi (1923–2015), American sociologist
Sadao Takagi (born 1932), Japanese entomologist
Sanshiro Takagi (born 1970), Japanese professional wrestler
Saya Takagi (born 1963), Japanese actress
Shingo Takagi (鷹木信悟, born 1982), Japanese professional wrestler
Takeo Takagi (1882–1944), Japanese vice admiral in World War II
Takuya Takagi, Japanese football player and football manager
Teiji Takagi (1875–1960), Japanese mathematician
Toranosuke Takagi (born 1974), Japanese race car driver
Wataru Takagi (born 1966), Japanese voice actor

Fictional characters
, titular character of the manga series Teasing Master Takagi-san
, a character in the manga series Tomie
, a character in the manga series Bakuman
, a character in the manga series Highschool of the Dead
 Main character in Die Hard

References

Japanese-language surnames